John Christopher Hewetson (10 January 1913 – 20 December 1990) was a British anarchist doctor, writer and newspaper editor. During the Second World War he was an editor of the anarchist newspaper War Commentary, which saw him imprisoned on three occasions. From the 1940s onwards he was active in advocating for freely available contraception and abortions.

Biography 
Hewetson was born in Birmingham to a wealthy family and was educated at Shrewsbury School before studying medicine at Magdalen College, the University of Oxford. In the run up to the Second War World he became active in the Forward Movement of the Peace Pledge Union with his companion Peta Edsall. In 1939 Hewetson and Edsall joined the anarchist movement and soon became involved in Freedom Press, editing the anarchist newspaper War Commentary. During the war he worked as a hospital casualty officer.

In 1940 Hewetson was imprisoned for a week for selling a "working class paper" outside Hyde Park having refused to pay a £1 fine. In 1942 he was imprisoned for two months for refusing to accept a commission in the Royal Army Medical Corps.

In 1945, alongside fellow War Commentary contributors Vernon Richards and Philip Sansom, Hewetson was sentenced to nine months imprisonment for conspiring to cause disaffection among members of the armed forces under Defence Regulation 39a. Coming at the end of the war, the four day trial at the Old Bailey saw significant press coverage and public controversy. The arrests led to the formation of the prominent Freedom Defence Committee. Following lobbying by Dr Charles Wortham Brook and MP Rhys Davies (both unknown to Hewetson) he was released early, on the 12 September 1945, on the condition that he work full time in a hospital. While in prison he wrote Ill-Health, Poverty and the State, arguing that the welfare state fails to address the underlying causes of poverty and poor health, namely capitalism and the state itself.

In 1947 Hewetson went into general practice. In the 1950s Hewetson advocated for freely available birth control and safe abortions. He worked to make contraceptives freely available for working-class women to enable them to have freer sex lives. He also helped to supply birth control materials into France where they were illegal. He regularly referred women to an illegal specialist for abortions. Initially he did this work alone, but over time formed a group practice. In 1951 he authored Sexual Freedom for the Young: Society and the Sexual Life of Children and Adolescents which drew on the work of Bronisław Malinowski and Wilhelm Reich.

Alongside being a GP, Hewetson was a visiting medical officer of the Camberwell Reception Centre (also known as the Spike) from 1951 until his retirement in 1983. Hewetson died on the 20 December 1990 in Surrey and was survived by his wife Phyllis, two daughters, two stepdaughters, and a stepson.

Publications 

 Italy after Mussolini (1945)
 Mutual Aid and Social Evolution (1946)
 Ill-Health, Poverty and the State (1946)
 Sexual Freedom for the Young: Society and the Sexual Life of Children and Adolescents (1951)

References 

1913 births
1990 deaths
People from Birmingham, West Midlands
Alumni of Magdalen College, Oxford
English anarchists
Medical doctors from the West Midlands (county)
British general practitioners
English newspaper editors
People educated at Shrewsbury School
English anti-war activists
Writers from Birmingham, West Midlands